The Athletics at the 2016 Summer Paralympics – Women's 800 metres T54 event at the 2016 Paralympic Games took place on 17 September 2016, at the Estádio Olímpico João Havelange.

Heats

Heat 1 
10:00 17 September 2016:

Heat 2 
10:08 17 September 2016:

Final 
17:53 17 September 2016:

Notes

Athletics at the 2016 Summer Paralympics